Mounir Guedjali (born June 14, 1987, in Béni Ourtilane) is an Algerian football player who is currently playing as a defender for US Biskra in the Algerian Ligue Professionnelle 2.

External links
 

1987 births
Algerian footballers
Algerian Ligue 2 players
Kabyle people
Living people
JSM Béjaïa players
MO Béjaïa players
People from Sétif Province
Association football defenders
21st-century Algerian people